Yarkona is a moshav in central Israel. Located in the Sharon plain near Hod HaSharon and Petah Tikva, it falls under the jurisdiction of Drom HaSharon Regional Council.

History
The moshav was founded in 1932 and was named after the nearby Yarkon River.

References

External links
Official website 
Correspondence with President of Israel

Moshavim
Populated places established in 1932
Populated places in Central District (Israel)
1932 establishments in Mandatory Palestine